Eberhard IV of Berg, count of Altena (also called Eberhard I von Altena) (1140 – 23 January 1180, buried in Altenberg), was a son of Adolf IV, Count of Berg and Altena.

He married Adelheid von Arnsberg (van Cuyck) (died 1200), a daughter of Heinrich I count von Arnsberg (born 1123, died 1185) and Ermengarde (Irmgard) von Freusburg (died 1203).

He inherited the eastern territorium of the County of Berg and became the 1st count of Altena from 1161, and Vogt of Werden and Cappenberg (1166–1180). His territories were later divided between his sons Arnold of Altena (the Isenberg, then Limburg (Lenne)  line) and Friedrich I of Altena (the Altena, then Marck line). Before the split between Arnold Altena-Isenberg the eldest and his brother Friedrich Altena-Mark the younger son of Everhard, the ‘Grafschaft Mark’ did not yet exist.

He left children:

 Oda (born 1165, died by 1224), married to Simon count von Tecklenburg (k.a. 1202). They had children:
 Otto II count von Teklenburg and
 Oda von Tecklenburg;
 Arnold of Altena (born 1166, died 1209), 1st count of Isenberg, followed by the counts of Limburg Hohenlimburg and Broich;
 Adolf of Altena, Archbishop of Cologne from 1193 until 1205, and between 1212 and 1214 (born 1168, died in Neuss on 15 April 1220);
 Friedrich I of Altena (died 1198).

Literature
 Kraus, T.R., Die Entstehung der Landesherrschaft der Grafen von Berg bis zum Jahre 1225, Neustadt an der Aisch 1981
 Andernach, N., Entwicklung der Grafschaft Berg, in: Land im Mittelpunkt der Mächte. Die Herzogtümer Jülich-Kleve-Berg, Kleve 1984, S.63-73.
 Hoederath, H.T. Der Fall des Hauses Isenberg 1225/1226 . In rechtsgeschichterlicher und soziologischer Schau, 1954 Zeitschrift der Savigny stiftung fur Rechtsgeschichte. Kanonistische Abteilung
 Aders, G. Die Grafen (von Limburg) und die Herrn von Limburg-Styrum aus dem Haus Berg-Altena-Isenberg. Zeitschift 'Der Marker" 1956 blad 7.
 Korteweg, K.N. Descendants of Dietrich I Graf von Limburg Hohenlimburg. (Corrected lineage). De Nederlandse Leeuw Jaargang LXXXI no.8 August 1964.
 Berg, A. Lineage counts of Limburg Hohenlimburg and Lords of Limburg-Styrum. (Same independent conclusion) Archive fur Sippenforschung Heft 14. Jahrgang 30. Mai 1964.
 Klueting, H. "'Daß sie ein Abspliß von der Grafschaft Mark ist, daran ist kein Zweifel'": Die Grafschaft Limburg vom 13. bis zum 19 Jahrhundert", in: Jahrburch des Vereins für Orts-und Heimatkunde in der Grafschaft Mark 93/93 (1995), pp 63–126.
 Eversberg, H. Graf Friederich von Isenberg und die Isenburg 1193–1226. Hattingen 1989
 Sollbach, G.E:  "Der gewaltsame Tod des Erzbischofs Engelbert I. von Köln am 7. November 1225. Ein mittelalterlicher Kriminalfall", in: Jahrbuch des Vereins für Ort- und Heimatkunde in der Grafschaft Mark, 93./94. Bd., 1995, pp 7–49.
 Bleicher, W. Hohenlimburgher Heimatblätter fűr den Raum Hagen und Isenlohn. Beiträge zur Landeskunde. Monatsschrift des Vereins fűr Orts- und Heimatkunde Hohenlimburg e.V. Drűck Geldsetzer und Schäfer Gmbh. Iserlohn. County of Limburg Lenne. 1976-2012

1140 births
1180 deaths
Counts of Germany
House of Berg
Counts of Limburg
House of Limburg-Stirum